Montagner is a surname. Notable people with this surname include:

 Domingos Montagner (1962-2016), Brazilian actor, playwright and entrepreneur
 Eduardo Montagner Anguiano (born 1975), Mexican-born Italian writer
 Santiago Montagner (born 1995), Argentine rugby union player 
 Benjamin Le Montagner (born 1988), French cyclist

See also 
 Montagna (disambiguation)